The Alpha Saga is an electric compact sedan to be produced by American electric vehicle company Alpha Motor Corporation. It is based on the Alpha Ace coupe.

Overview
The Alpha Saga was revealed on November 19, 2021 at the Los Angeles Auto Show as essentially a 4-door sedan version of the Ace 2-door coupe.

Specifications

References

Sedans
Upcoming car models